Edwin Alfred Marshall (21 August 1904 – 28 January 1970) was an English first-class cricketer active 1937–38 who played for Nottinghamshire. He was born and died in Nottingham.

References

1904 births
1970 deaths
English cricketers
Nottinghamshire cricketers